Shane Andre Malcolm (born 13 October 1991) is a Jamaican-born Guamanian international footballer who most recently played as an attacking midfielder for Colorado Springs Switchbacks and for the Guam national team.

Career

Club 

Malcolm played for Colorado Springs Switchbacks FC.

International 

Malcolm represents Guam internationally.

Personal life 

Malcolm was born in Jamaica, but his family moved to Sunrise, Florida, United States when he was nine years old. He qualifies to play for Guam through his paternal grandmother.

Career statistics

Club

International

Statistics accurate as of match played 11 June 2019

International goals
Score and Result list Guam's goal tally first

References

External links

1991 births
Living people
Jamaican people of American descent
Jamaican footballers
Guamanian footballers
Guam international footballers
High Point Panthers men's soccer players
Floridians FC players
Reading United A.C. players
North Carolina Fusion U23 players
Kitsap Pumas players
Colorado Springs Switchbacks FC players
Association football midfielders
Soccer players from Florida
USL League Two players
National Premier Leagues players
USL Championship players